, is an asteroid, classified as near-Earth object of the Apollo group that is a temporary quasi-satellite of the Earth, the third known Earth quasi-satellite.

Discovery, orbit and physical properties

 was discovered on 12 June 2013. As of September 2014, it has been observed 26 times with a data-arc span of 349 days. It is an Apollo asteroid and its semi-major axis (1.0016 AU) is very similar to that of the Earth but it has relatively high eccentricity (0.4521) and high orbital inclination (49.9761°). With an absolute magnitude of 21.7, it has a diameter in the range 130–300 m (for an assumed albedo range of 0.04–0.20).

Quasi-satellite dynamical state and orbital evolution
 has been identified as an Earth quasi-satellite following a kidney-shaped retrograde orbit around the Earth.

See also

Notes

  This is assuming an albedo of 0.20–0.04.

References

Further reading
 Understanding the Distribution of Near-Earth Asteroids Bottke, W. F., Jedicke, R., Morbidelli, A., Petit, J.-M., Gladman, B. 2000, Science, Vol. 288, Issue 5474, pp. 2190–2194.
 A Numerical Survey of Transient Co-orbitals of the Terrestrial Planets Christou, A. A. 2000, Icarus, Vol. 144, Issue 1, pp. 1–20.
 Debiased Orbital and Absolute Magnitude Distribution of the Near-Earth Objects Bottke, W. F., Morbidelli, A., Jedicke, R., Petit, J.-M., Levison, H. F., Michel, P., Metcalfe, T. S. 2002, Icarus, Vol. 156, Issue 2, pp. 399–433.
 Transient co-orbital asteroids Brasser, R., Innanen, K. A., Connors, M., Veillet, C., Wiegert, P., Mikkola, S., Chodas, P. W. 2004, Icarus, Vol. 171, Issue 1, pp. 102–109. 
 A Kozai-resonating Earth quasi-satellite Connors, M.  2014, Monthly Notices of the Royal Astronomical Society, Vol. 437, Issue 1, pp. L85–L89.
 Asteroid 2014 OL339: yet another Earth quasi-satellite de la Fuente Marcos, C., de la Fuente Marcos, R.  2014, Monthly Notices of the Royal Astronomical Society, Vol. 445, Issue 3, pp. 2985–2994.

External links 
 Discovery MPEC 
  data at MPC
 
 
 

Minor planet object articles (unnumbered)
Venus-crossing asteroids
Earth-crossing asteroids

20130612